Mourèze is a commune in the Hérault department in the Occitanie region in southern France.

At the edge of the village are spectacular dolomitic limestone formations known as the Cirque de Mourèze.

Population

See also
Communes of the Hérault department

References

Communes of Hérault